Yanhuang or Yan Huang (Chinese language: t , s , p Yán Huáng) was the name of an ethnic group of ancient China who inhabited the Yellow River basin area. They claimed their descent from the two tribes led by the Flame Emperor (Yandi) and Yellow Emperor (Huangdi) . Their main achievement was to join together to strengthen the basis of the two tribes and their civilized community. The Yanhuang were the founders of the Chinese people and the initiators of Chinese culture.

Shaodian’s wife Youjiao gave birth to the Yellow Emperor near the Ji River and the Yan Emperor next to the Jiang River which accounted for their different temperaments. Although Shaodian preceded the Yellow and Yan emperors, he was not their father.

During the time of Huangdi, Shennong’s descendants declined. Hong Sheng and the Yan emperor were descended from Shennong. They both possessed comprehensive knowledge. Five hundred years elapsed from Shennong to the time of the Yellow and Yan emperors. The Yan emperor was the last generation; Shennong, Shaodian, the Flame [Yan] Emperors, and Huangdi all preceded him.

See also
 Huaxia
 Yan Huang Zisun, literally "descendants of Yan and Yellow Emperor"

References

External links 
 Guoyu Original text in Chinese.

Ancient China
Chinese culture
Chinese words and phrases
Han Chinese
Northern China
Yellow River